A burgstall is a German term referring to a castle of which so little is left that its appearance cannot effectively be reconstructed.

Burgstall may also refer to:

Inhabited places

Austria
 Burgstall, a village in Hermagor-Pressegger See, Hermagor, Carinthia

 Groß Burgstall, a village in Sankt Bernhard-Frauenhofen, Jorn, Lower Austria
 Klein-Burgstall, a village in Maissau, Hollabrunn, Lower Austria

 Burgstall, a village in Regau, Vöcklabruck, Upper Austria

 Burgstall (Großklein), a cadastral municipality of Großklein, Leibnitz, Styria

Germany
 Burgstall, Saxony-Anhalt, a village in Börde, Saxony-Anhalt
 Burgstall an der Murr, a village in Burgstetten, Rems-Murr-Kreis, Baden-Württemberg
 Burgstall (Creglingen), a village in Creglingen, Main-Tauber-Kreis, Baden-Württemberg

 Burgstall, a village in Hirschau, Amberg-Sulzbach, Bavaria

Italy
 Burgstall, South Tyrol

Mountains and hills

 Hoher Burgstall (Kalkkögel), a mountain in the Kalkkögel in Tyrol, Austria
 Burgstall (Oberpfalz), a summit of the Hoher Bogen, Bavaria, Germany

 Burgstall (Upper Palatinate), a mountain in the Bavarian Forest, Germany

Other uses
 Burgstall, an island in the Abtsdorfer See, Rupertiwinkel, Bavaria, Germany
 Château du Burgstall, a ruined castle in Guebwiller, Haut-Rhin, France

See also
 Burgstaller